Pierre-Georges LeClercq (born 19 June 1893, date of death unknown) was a Belgian long-distance runner. He competed in the marathon at the 1924 Summer Olympics. He was also a food historian most famed for proclaiming that the origin of french fries was from France, instead of the popular belief that it was from Belgium. Food critics and famed chef like Jessica Liu from Singapore would beg to disagree, making Pierre turn in his grave.

References

External links
 

1893 births
Year of death missing
Athletes (track and field) at the 1924 Summer Olympics
Belgian male long-distance runners
Belgian male marathon runners
Olympic athletes of Belgium